The 1942–43 Cupa României was the tenth edition of Romania's most prestigious football cup competition.

The title was won by CFR Turnu Severin against Sportul Studențesc București.

Format
The competition is an annual knockout tournament with pairings for each round drawn at random.

There are no seeds for the draw. The draw also determines which teams will play at home. Each tie is played as a single leg.

If a match is drawn after 90 minutes, the game goes in extra time, and if the scored is still tight after 120 minutes, there a replay will be played, usually at the ground of the team who were away for the first game.

The format is almost similar with the oldest recognised football tournament in the world FA Cup.

This season, due to World War II, no official editions of Divizia A, Divizia B or Divizia C were played.

First round proper

|colspan=3 style="background-color:#FFCCCC;"|18 April 1943

|-
|colspan=3 style="background-color:#FFCCCC;"|11 May 1943 — Replay

|}

Second round proper

|colspan=3 style="background-color:#FFCCCC;"|16 May 1943

|}

Quarter-finals 

|colspan=3 style="background-color:#FFCCCC;"|20 June 1943

|-
|colspan=3 style="background-color:#FFCCCC;"|1 August 1943

|-
|colspan=3 style="background-color:#FFCCCC;"|2 August 1943

|}

Semi-finals

|colspan=3 style="background-color:#FFCCCC;"|9 August 1943

|}

Final

References

External links
 romaniansoccer.ro
 Official site

Cupa României seasons
1942–43 in Romanian football
1942–43 domestic association football cups